Robert Hermann Sterl (23 June 1867 – 10 January 1932) was a German painter and graphic artist.

Life 
Sterl was born in Großdobritz, now part of Dresden, the son of a stonemason. From 1881 to 1888, he attended the Dresden Academy of Fine Arts, where he studied under Leon Pohle and Julius Scholtz, later becoming a master student of Ferdinand Pauwels. A stay at the artists' colony in Goppeln near Bannewitz introduced him to impressionism and plein air painting.

After leaving Pauwels' studio, he worked as a landscape painter and portraitist and, until 1904, operated a private painting school for women. In 1893, he became one of the founding members of the Dresden Secession. He was appointed a Professor at the Academy in 1906, where he taught until 1931, and became an associate member of the Berlin Secession in 1909. From 1913 to 1930, he was a member of the Dresdner Galeriekommission and, from 1920, had a seat on the Gallery Advisory Board, both of which positions enabled him to help young artists. When Gotthardt Kuehl died in 1915, Sterl took over his Master Class. During World War I, he worked as a war painter, on the Western Front in 1915 and the southern front in the Dolomites in 1917. After the war, he bought a house in Struppen and built a spacious studio there.

Work and legacy
In addition to the usual impressionist subject matter, he painted musicians and workers, especially quarrymen. He was sympathetic to liberal causes, producing many socially conscious works; some of which are set in Russia, where he had travelled briefly before the war. Two of his paintings were labelled "degenerate art" in 1937 and removed from the Galerie Neue Meister. During the GDR years, his works were praised for some of the same reasons the Nazis had condemned them.

He died in Struppen after a long illness and was buried at his home, bequeathing his estate to the Academy for the purpose of discovering and promoting new artists. The "Robert and Helene Sterl Foundation" was created just before his death in 1931 and, since 1981, the home has been operated as a museum and research facility. Beginning in 1997, the Foundation and related organizations have awarded the "Robert Sterl Prize" to a master student at the Academy. The prize includes €3,000 and an exhibit at the museum.

Selected works

References

Further reading 
 Robert Sterl und die Kinder, Gemälde, Graphiken und Zeichnungen im Robert-Sterl-Haus, Text by Horst Zimmermann. Guide book, Sammelstiftungen des Bezirkes Dresden, 1998.
 Robert-Sterl-Haus, Naundorf/Struppen, Sächsische Museen, Vol.14, Sächsische Landesstelle für Museumswesen, Joachim Voigtmann, Berlin 2004, .
 Robert Sterl: Werkverzeichnis der Gemälde und Ölskizzen, edited by Kristina Popova with Birgit Dalbajewa and Gisbert Porstmann, Sandstein Verlag, Dresden 2011, .
 Horst Zimmermann: Der Maler Robert Sterl: Leben und Werk in Briefen und Selbstzeugnissen, Sandstein Verlag, Dresden 2011, .

External links 

 Robert-Sterl-Haus, museum website
 Drawings by Sterl @ Deutsche Fotothek
 
 

1867 births
1932 deaths
Impressionism
Artists from Dresden
19th-century German painters
19th-century German male artists
German male painters
20th-century German painters
20th-century German male artists